Rumasuma is an album by the saxophonist Sonny Simmons, which was recorded in 1969 and released on the Contemporary label in 1970.

Reception

AllMusic reviewer Scott Yanow described the album as containing "exciting and very creative music." Jazz & Blues wrote that "Simmons and his associates bring to all these items an intensity of purpose which transcends their differing characteristics, so that the impression the listener takes away is of a group of players at once liberated from stylistic prejudice and wholeheartedly committed to the task at hand." The editors of Billboard included the album in their list of "4 Star" releases.

Track listing 
All compositions by Sonny Simmons
 "Rumasuma" - 10:50
 "Back to the Apple" - 10:25
 "Reincarnation" - 11:35
 "For Posterity" - 10:38

Personnel 
Sonny Simmons - alto saxophone
Barbara Donald - trumpet
Michael Cohen - piano
Bill Pickens, Jerry Sealand  - double bass
Billy Higgins - drums

References 

Sonny Simmons albums
1970 albums
Contemporary Records albums